West Moreton Anglican College (WMAC) is a private school affiliated with the Anglican Church of Australia. It is located in Karrabin, a suburb of Ipswich, Queensland, Australia.

The school covers Pre-school to Year 12 and is coeducational. Its student body is divided into five houses, Gilmore, Lawson, Mackellar, Paterson, and Wright. The majority of the students are from rural families as the school supplies an agriculture unit.   

WMAC is known to have a co-educational environment (Prep to Year 12) all on one campus in 3 sub-schools, boasting 38 hectares of land including dams, farms, and a chapel. Vocational Education and Training Programs and "Respect and Responsibility" Pastoral Care Programs (Prep to Year 12) are exercised to benefit students. 170 Sports, Arts, and other extra-curricular activities are offered and an Outdoor Education Program (Prep to Year 12) is provided for those staying after school. There is also Defence Transition Programs as the college is known to have close affiliations with the RAAF Base.

References

External links 
 

 Schools in Ipswich, Queensland
 Anglican schools in Queensland
 The Associated Schools member schools